"Leave Me Alone" is the first solo song by American rock musician Jerry Cantrell, the guitarist/vocalist of the band Alice in Chains. It was originally featured on the soundtrack to the 1996 film The Cable Guy and was also the film's closing track. The song was released as a single and peaked at No. 14 on Billboard's Mainstream Rock Tracks chart. A remixed version of the song was included on Jerry Cantrell's 2016 digital EP My Song.

Origin
Jerry Cantrell talked about the song to Guitar School magazine in August 1996:

Reception
Stephen Thomas Erlewine of AllMusic wrote: "Jerry Cantrell's contribution [Leave Me Alone] rocks as hard as any Alice in Chains track".

Music video
A black and white music video directed by Rocky Morton was released in June 1996 to accompany the single. It features Jerry Cantrell and drummer Sean Kinney performing while footage from The Cable Guy is displayed on a screen behind them. Jim Carrey also appears in the video coming out of a television screen haunting Jerry Cantrell.

The music video was included as a bonus feature on the 15th-anniversary edition Blu-ray of The Cable Guy in 2011.

Chart positions

Track listing

Personnel
 Jerry Cantrell – vocals, guitar and bass
 Sean Kinney – drums

Production
Produced by Jerry Cantrell, Toby Wright
Engineered by Darrell Peters, David Bryant
Mixed by Toby Wright

References

External links

1996 songs
1996 debut singles
Jerry Cantrell songs
Songs written by Jerry Cantrell
Film theme songs
Sony BMG singles
Song recordings produced by Jerry Cantrell